Jacksonville Historic District may refer to:

Downtown Jacksonville Historic District, Jacksonville, Alabama, listed on the NRHP in Calhoun County, Alabama
Jacksonville Historic District (Jacksonville, Illinois), listed on the NRHP in Morgan County, Illinois
Jacksonville Historic District (Jacksonville, Oregon), a U.S. National Historic Landmark in Oregon